Paul Nunnari (born 6 February 1973 in Auburn, New South Wales) is a Paralympic athletics competitor from New South Wales, Australia.  
He was hit by a car at the age of 11  and is a wheelchair user. He has competed in wheelchair athletics events in three Paralympic Games - 1996 Atlanta, 2000 Sydney and 2004 Athens. He won a silver medal at the 2000 Sydney Games in the men's 4 × 100 m relay T54 event. In 1993–1994, he was an Australian Institute of Sport Athlete with a Disability scholarship holder.

He has been a strong advocate for disability services and sport. In 2006, he raised the issue of Virgin Airlines making carers pay for accompanying wheelchair passengers. He established the Bob Jane T-Mart Paul Nunnari Wheelchair Push to raise awareness of cancer.  He is community development officer with Macarthur Disability Services.

In 2010, he unsuccessfully stood in the Australian Labor Party preselection for the Federal Seat of Macarthur.

In 2013, he auditioned for Australia's Got Talent and got through.

In 2022, he awarded the Public Service Medal (PSM) for outstanding public service to New South Wales, particularly in the field of access and inclusion.

References

Paralympic athletes of Australia
Athletes (track and field) at the 2000 Summer Paralympics
Paralympic silver medalists for Australia
Australian Institute of Sport Paralympic track and field athletes
1973 births
Living people
Medalists at the 2000 Summer Paralympics
Paralympic medalists in athletics (track and field)
Australia's Got Talent contestants
Australian male wheelchair racers